DMK may refer to:

 Dravida Munnetra Kazhagam, a political party in South India
 DMK, IATA code for Don Mueang International Airport, in Bangkok, Thailand
 DMK (band), a Colombian Depeche Mode cover band
 David Moberg Karlsson – Swedish footballer
 Denmark Hill railway station, London, National Rail station code DMK
 Dimethyl ketone, also known as propanone, a colourless organic solvent